The Vypin Lighthouse or Cochin Lighthouse is situated at Puthuvype in Kochi, Kerala. Even though the current lighthouse started functioning only by 15 November 1979, the Cochin Lighthouse has a long history. The lighthouse which was functioning in Fort Kochi from 1839 was shifted to Puthuvype in 1979. It is the tallest lighthouse in Kerala.

Visiting Time: 10am-1pm,2pm- 6pm

Working day: Tue,Wed,Thu,Fri,Sat,Sun

Holiday: Monday

Entry Fees: 20rs

Now visitors are allowed after Covid-19 pandemic. Putuvype beach is nearby and is open for visitors. Last updated on 8 Dec 2021.

Technical details 

History

The old light at Fort Kochi 

An oil lamp light started functioning at Fort Kochi in 1839. In 1902, a new light and reflecting mechanism was introduced. Modifications were made in 1914. In the 1920s, a new 10-meter tall tower was erected.

In 1936, a 25-meter tall steel tower was installed with a gaslight. In 1966, a mechanism called sun valve was introduced. Plans to construct a taller and brighter light and a radio beacon were drawn up. Since there was a paucity of land, the new light was transferred to Puthuvype in the Vypin Island and the radio beacon was shifted to Azhikode.

See also 

 List of lighthouses in India

References

External links 

 
 Directorate General of Lighthouses and Lightships

Lighthouses in Kerala
Buildings and structures in Kochi
1839 establishments in British India
Transport in Kochi
Lighthouses completed in 1979
1979 establishments in Kerala